The Idaho Statesman is the daily newspaper of Boise, Idaho, in the western United States. It is owned by The McClatchy Company.

History
The paper was first published as the Idaho Tri-Weekly Statesman on July 26, 1864, by James S. Reynolds; it began publication from a log cabin on the current site of Boise City Hall. Reynolds owned and operated the paper for its first eight years, selling to Judge Milton Kelly in 1872. Kelly's 17-year run ended in 1888, with the expansion to daily publication, and a name change: The Idaho Daily Statesman.

That summer, Kelly sold the paper to the Cobb family, which went on to run the paper for 70 years. Calvin Cobb published the Statesman until his death in 1928, when control was transferred to his daughter Margaret Cobb Ailshie. The paper's history site says "Ailshie insisted on a lively editorial policy, deploring 'a dull newspaper'".

Cobb Ailshie died in 1959, and general manager James Brown took control of the paper. Federated Publications bought the Idaho Statesman in 1963. It joined five other publications in Washington, Indiana, and Michigan. Federated merged with Gannett in 1971. The paper then relocated operations to Curtis Road in Boise in 1972.

Fire
In the early morning of March 21, 2004, the Statesmans pressroom caught on fire, which left two of the newspaper's nine press units severely damaged and two units partially destroyed. Newspapers from other cities chipped in and helped deliver papers to Boise.

Sale
After 34 years of ownership, Gannett agreed to sell the Statesman to Knight Ridder on August 3, 2005, along with The Bellingham Herald and The Olympian newspapers in western Washington; McClatchy bought Knight Ridder the following year. On February 13, 2020, parent company McClatchy filed Chapter 11 bankruptcy. As of that date, they owned 30 newspapers nationwide.

Outsourced printing
This partnership allowed the Statesman to reduce expenses amidst declining revenues.

Publications:
 Idaho Statesman - daily newspaper
 Scene - weekly entertainment tabloid
 IdahoStatesman.com - online news
 Treasure Magazine - quarterly lifestyle magazine
 Business Insider - weekly business publication

Notable people
E. L. "Shorty" Fuller was a photographer for the Statesman from 1937–1942. An archive of his work is found in the Idaho State Historical Society containing 3,000 of his negatives, prints and scrapbooks.
Marjorie Paxson

References

External links

 
 
 History
 The McClatchy Company's subsidiary profile of the Idaho Statesman

Newspapers published in Idaho
McClatchy publications
Mass media in Boise, Idaho
Daily newspapers published in the United States